ORP "Podhalanin" - torpedo boat (former A-80   of Kaiserliche Marine), one of the first ships of the Polish Navy recreated after Poland regained its independence in 1918.  In service from 1924 to 1938.

She was built in 1917 as a small coastal torpedo boat by A.G. Vulcan in Stettin, Germany (now in Poland). The ship was transferred to Poland in 1919 and until 1921 named ORP "Góral".  Due to lack of funds, it was only in 1924 that the ship was refitted and officially commissioned.  She was taken out of service as  a combat ship in 1938 and used in various auxiliary roles until 1939.  Her fate after the German invasion is unknown.

Specifications
Displacement: 330-335 tons, 381-392 tons full load
Maximum speed: 28 knots
Armament: 
German service:  2 × 88 mm guns, 1 × 450 mm torpedo tubes (class armament, A-80 had unique armament of 3 × 88 mm guns and no torpedo tubes )
Polish service: 2 × 75 mm guns, 2 × 450 mm torpedo tubes

References

Bibliography

Torpedo boats of the Polish Navy
1917 ships
Ships built in Stettin
World War I torpedo boats of Germany
Torpedo boats of the Imperial German Navy